Jules Gressier, (24 June 1897, Roubaix (Nord-Pas-de-Calais) - 27 June 1960, Aix-les-Bains (Rhône-Alpes) was a French conductor, particularly associated with lyric repertoire and with operetta.

Life and career 
In early 1926 Gressier conducted Le Barbier de Séville, Véronique and Miss Heylett in Toulouse with the orchestra of the Variétés and soloists Mathieu-Lutz, Foix and René Gerbert.

He conducted the local premieres of Chanson d'amour and Ciboulette in Toulouse in 1926-27, both with Andrée Verly in the title role.

Gressier was a member of the conducting staff at Nice Opera in the 1934 season.

He conducted the première of the three-act opérette Malvina by Hahn in March 1935, which he also conducted at the Opéra-Comique in 1950 Vieux Garçons ! by Louis Urgel in February 1931, and Un p'tit bout d'femme by René Mercier in 1936 all at the Théâtre de la Gaîté Lyrique in Paris, with which he was associated in the 1930s.

Gressier conducted most of a festival concert in honour of Gustave Charpentier in September 1937 at the Théâtre des Champs-Élysées in Paris with excerpts from Le Couronnement de la Muse du Peuple and selections from Louise (act 3 of which was conducted by the composer).

A member of the music staff of French radio evacuated to Rennes already in September 1940, Gressier was the chief conductor of the 60-strong Orchestre lyrique de la Radiodiffusion nationale (French radio) from 1941 to 1951. He was made head of lyrical broadcasting in 1943 with the musical programming of French radio, which he continued until his death. Gressier himself conducted many opera and operetta broadcasts.

Gressier made his debut at the Paris Opéra-Comique in 1948 with Mignon, and conducted Rigoletto at the Opéra in September 1950.

He was noted for his sensitive and enlightened direction of operetta, especially Offenbach.

Recordings 
Complete, or extended excerpts from operas were recorded by Gressier as follows, with record company labels and year given where available:

 Cendrillon (Jules Massenet) rec 25 December 1943
 Thaïs (Jules Massenet) 1944
 Faust (Charles Gounod) 1947
 Otello (Giuseppe Verdi) 1948
 Le Domino noir (Daniel François Esprit Auber) 1950
 La Fille de Madame Angot (Charles Lecocq) 1951, Pathé
 Monsieur Beaucaire (André Messager) 1951, Pathé
 La Belle Hélène (Jacques Offenbach) 1951, Pathé
 Les Cloches de Corneville (Robert Planquette) 1951, Pathé
 Phi-Phi (Henri Christiné) 1952,  Pathé
 Véronique (André Messager) 1952, Pathé
 Le Petit duc (Charles Lecocq) 1953, Pathé (with Liliane Berton (La Duchesse de Parthenay), Nadine Renaux (Le Duc de Parthenay), Willy Clément (Montlandry), René Hérent (Frimousse))
 Les Saltimbanques (Louis Ganne) 1953, Pathé (with Liliane Berton (Suzanne), Freda Betti (Marion), and Claude Devos (Paillasse))
 La Veuve Joyeuse (Franz Lehár) 1953, Pathé
 Orphée aux Enfers (Jacques Offenbach) 1953, Pathé
 Les P'tites Michu (André Messager) 1954, Pathé
 Le Tzarewitch (Johann Strauss) 1954 
 Le Barbier de Séville (Gioacchino Rossini) 1954-55, Pathé
 Lakmé (Léo Delibes) 1955, Rodolphe
 Moineau (Louis Beydts) 1955
 Au soleil de Mexique (Maurice Yvain) 1955 
 Hans le joueur de flûte (Louis Ganne) 1955, Gaieté Lyrique
 Madame Chrysanthème (André Messager) 1956
 Walzer aus Wien (Johann Strauss II) 1957, Pathé
 La Mascotte (Edmond Audran) 1958, Pathé (with Michel Dens, (Pippo), Duvaleix, (Laurent XVII), Claude Devos, (Fritellini))
 Monsieur Beaucaire (André Messager) 1958, Gaieté Lyrique (with Martha Angelici, Michel Dens)
 Rip (Robert Planquette) 1958, Pathé (with Michel Dens, (Rip), Claude Devos, (Jack) Julien Giovanetti, (Derrick))
 Les mousquetaires au couvent (Louis Varney) Pathé-Marconi, 1958 (with Michel Dens, (Narcisse de Brissac), Duvaleix (abbé Bridaine) ; Raymond Amade (Solanges))
 Mireille (Charles Gounod), 1959, Chant du Monde
 Isoline : ballet (André Messager)

References

External links 
 Jules Gressier on data.bnf.fr

1897 births
French classical musicians
French male conductors (music)
1960 deaths
People from Roubaix
20th-century French conductors (music)
20th-century French male musicians